Mediyawa Grama Niladhari Division is a Grama Niladhari Division of the Thalawa Divisional Secretariat of Anuradhapura District of North Central Province, Sri Lanka. It has Grama Niladhari Division Code 392.

Mediyawa is a surrounded by the Galwaduwagama, Eliyadivulwewa, Ihala Siyambalewa, Katiyawa Track 01, Kadigawa and Katiyawa Track 02 Grama Niladhari Divisions.

Demographics

Ethnicity 
The Mediyawa Grama Niladhari Division has a Sinhalese majority (100.0%). In comparison, the Thalawa Divisional Secretariat (which contains the Mediyawa Grama Niladhari Division) has a Sinhalese majority (98.7%)

Religion 
The Mediyawa Grama Niladhari Division has a Buddhist majority (99.3%). In comparison, the Thalawa Divisional Secretariat (which contains the Mediyawa Grama Niladhari Division) has a Buddhist majority (97.9%)

References 

Grama Niladhari Divisions of Thalawa Divisional Secretariat